Frozen Man Creek is a stream in the U.S. state of South Dakota. It is a tributary of Sulphur Creek.

Frozen Man Creek received its name from an incident when a pioneer froze to death near it.

See also
List of rivers of South Dakota

References

Rivers of Butte County, South Dakota
Rivers of Meade County, South Dakota
Rivers of South Dakota